Micrandra is a plant genus of the family Euphorbiaceae first described in 1854. It is native to South America.

Species 
Species currently included in Micrandra:

 Micrandra australis (R.E.Schult.) R.E.Schult. - Amazonas in Brazil
 Micrandra elata (Didr.) Müll.Arg. - Suriname, French Guiana, Guyana, Colombia, Peru (Pasco, Loreto), Brazil (São Paulo, Bahia, Amapá, Amazonas, etc.)
 Micrandra glabra (R.E.Schult.) R.E.Schult. - S Venezuela (Bolívar, Amazonas), Guyana, Suriname
 Micrandra gleasoniana (Croizat) R.E.Schult. - Guyana
 Micrandra heterophylla Poiss. - Amazonas in Venezuela
 Micrandra inundata P.E.Berry & Wiedenh. - Amazonas in Venezuela
 Micrandra lopezii R.E.Schult. - Amazonas in Brazil
 Micrandra minor Benth. - Colombia (Amazonas, Vaupes), Venezuela (Bolívar, Amazonas), Brazil (Amazonas), Peru (Pasco, Loreto)
 Micrandra rossiana R.E.Schult. - Guyana, Venezuela (Bolívar, Amazonas, Apure, Zulia), Colombia (Vaupés), Ecuador, Brazil (Amazonas, Roraima)
 Micrandra siphonioides Benth. - French Guiana, Venezuela (Bolívar, Amazonas, Apure), Colombia, Peru, Brazil (Amazonas, Bahia, São Paulo, Pará)
 Micrandra spruceana (Baill.) R.E.Schult. - Suriname, Venezuela (Amazonas), Colombia (Amazonas, Vaupes), Peru (Loreto, Pasco, San Martín), Brazil (Amazonas, Roraima)
 Micrandra sprucei (Müll.Arg.) R.E.Schult. - Guyana, Colombia (Vaupés), Venezuela (Amazonas), Brazil (Amazonas)

References 

Euphorbiaceae genera
Crotonoideae
Flora of South America